Keegan Hirst (born 13 February 1988) is an English professional rugby league footballer who plays as a  for Batley Bulldogs in the Betfred Championship.

He played for the Hunslet Hawks in 2008 National League Two, and the Dewsbury Rams in 2009 Championship 1 and the Championship. Hirst also played for the Batley Bulldogs in two separate spells and for Featherstone Rovers in the Championship. He played for Wakefield Trinity in the Super League, and spent time on loan from Wakefield at Dewsbury and Halifax in the second tier.  After the abandonment of the 2020 Championship season, Hirst signed for a third spell with Batley but in October 2020 announced his retirement from the game.

In 2015 he became the first British professional rugby league footballer to come out as gay.

Background
Hirst was born in Batley, West Yorkshire, England.

Playing career
Hirst began his career as an academy player at Bradford Bulls before joining Hunslet Hawks in 2008.  After a season with the Hunslet Hawks, Hirst moved to Dewsbury Rams for two seasons and then moved to Batley Bulldogs for the 2012 season. In 2013 he moved to Featherstone Rovers but returned to Batley, first on loan and then on a permanent move in 2014.

In August 2016 Hirst signed a deal with Wakefield Trinity to play for the Super League side from 2017.  Hirst made his Super League début in the round 6 match of Super League XXII against Leigh Centurions.

In popular culture
In 2016 Hirst was a dater on Channel 4's dating show First Dates, also in 2016 Hirst took part in W's Celebrity Haunted Hotel.

Personal life
Hirst is divorced with two children.  In an interview with the Sunday Mirror in August 2015 he came out as gay, becoming the first British professional rugby league player to do so.

As of 2022, Hirst is in a relationship with British YouTuber Joel Wood.

See also
Ian Roberts – first openly gay rugby league player
Gareth Thomas – first openly gay rugby union player

References

External links
Wakefield Trinity profile
Batley Bulldogs profile
SL profile

1988 births
Living people
Batley Bulldogs players
Dewsbury Rams players
English rugby league players
Featherstone Rovers players
Gay sportsmen
Halifax R.L.F.C. players
Hunslet R.L.F.C. players
LGBT rugby league players
English LGBT sportspeople
Rugby league players from Batley
Rugby league props
Wakefield Trinity players